The 2016 Comoros Premier League was the top level football competition in the Comoros. It was played from 31 October to 20 November 2016.

Teams
The champions of the three regional leagues of each island will take part in the final tournament to determinate the overall champions.
Champions of Mwali: Fomboni FC (Fomboni)
Champions of Ndzuwani: Steal Nouvel FC de Sima (Sima)
Champions of Ngazidja: Ngaya Club de Mdé (Mdé)

Standings

References

Football leagues in the Comoros
Premier League
Comoros